Harald Haakonsson  (died December 1131) was joint Earl of Orkney in 1122–1127.

References

1131 deaths
Earls of Orkney
12th-century rulers in Europe
Year of birth unknown
Mormaers of Caithness
12th-century mormaers